Miriquidica deusta is a species of lichen in the family Lecanoraceae. A North American native, it generally grows on siliceous rocks. It belongs to the subdivision Pezizomycotina of the division Ascomycota, within the order Lecanorales. These are found in both general and Estonian herbariums.

Gallery

References

Further reading
  Online journals-'On Some Saxicolous Lecideoid Lichens of the Beringian Region and Adjacent Areas of Eastern Siberia and Russian Far East'.
  The Bryologist (BioOne Online Journals)- 'Recent Literature on Lichens—194'.

Lecanorales
Lichen species
Lichens of North America
Taxa named by Christian Stenhammar
Lichens described in 1833